Christopher Ulmer is an American disability-rights advocate, former special education teacher, YouTuber, and founder of the non-profit Special Books by Special Kids.

Early life and education 
Ulmer was born in Philadelphia, Pennsylvania, and attended Upper Moreland High School. He attended Pennsylvania State University, where he majored in media effects. He received a master's degree in special education from the University of the Cumberlands in Kentucky, where he was a student teacher.

Career 
After graduation, he moved to Jacksonville, Florida. He coached soccer at a university and was offered a free degree in special education. He began teaching special education to students aged 7 to 10. As a special education teacher, he taught students with autism, agenesis of the corpus callosum and traumatic brain injury.

With permission from his students’ parents, in the classroom Ulmer "began to film interviews with his students and post them on social media," which attracted an online presence. After 12 months, Special Books by Special Kids "evolved into an acceptance movement that’s reached over one billion people."

Ulmer began his online presence through Facebook in 2016 and a year later reached 1.2 million followers. In 2017, Ulmer created the YouTube channel Special Books by Special Kids (commonly abbreviated as SBSK). On November 19, 2018, the Special Books by Special Kids YouTube channel reached 1 million subscribers.

He crisscrossed the country interviewing disabled children to give them, as ABC News put it, "an opportunity to be seen and accepted." As a result, Ulmer has created more than 500 videos of those interviews. A partial transcript, as an example of an interview of a child by Ulmer, is included in the book Flying Starts for Unique Children by author and special-needs teacher Adele Devine.

Awards and nominations

References 

1989 births
Ulmer, Christopher
American YouTubers
YouTube channels launched in 2016
American disability rights activists
University of the Cumberlands alumni
Pennsylvania State University alumni
Educators from Florida
People from Jacksonville, Florida
Educators from Philadelphia
21st-century American educators